Bachelor Creek may refer to:

Bachelor Creek (Missouri)
Bachelor Creek (South Dakota)